Cát Hải is a rural district (huyện) of Hai Phong, the third largest city of Vietnam. It includes the old Cát Bà town since 1977.

As of 2018 the district had a population of 43,187.

The island is subject to major land developments. Vinfast is building an automobile factory on the southern half of the island, and Sun Group is developing a holiday resort on the northern half. A 5.44 km long bridge - the longest sea crossing in Vietnam - connects the island to Hai Phong.

References

External links

Districts of Haiphong